The Boston College Eagles represented Boston College in Women's Hockey East Association play during the 2014–15 NCAA Division I women's ice hockey season. The Eagles were repeat qualifiers for the NCAA Tournament. Alexandra Carpenter would become the first player in BC program history to win the Patty Kazmaier Award.

Offseason
August 5: Eight members of the Eagles roster were invited to participate at the 2014 USA Hockey Women’s National Festival in Lake Placid, New York. Alex Carpenter, who earned a silver medal at the 2014 Sochi Winter Games were joined by Lexi Bender, Emily Field, Emily Pfalzer, Haley Skarupa, Dana Trivigno, Andie Anastos and Megan Keller. In addition, former Eagles Corinne Boyles and Blake Bolden, the first African-American selected in the first round of the CWHL Draft, also gained invitations.

Recruiting

Roster

2014–15 Eagles

Schedule

|-
!colspan=12 style=" "| Regular Season

|-
!colspan=12 style=" "| WHEA Tournament

|-
!colspan=12 style=" "| NCAA Tournament

Awards and honors
Regular Season Hockey East Champions
Alex Carpenter, Cammy Granato Player of the Year (Hockey East)
Katie King-Crowley, Coach of the Year
Katie Burt, Goaltending Champion
Emily Pfalzer, Best Defenseman
Katie Burt, Megan Keller, Tori Sullivan, Pro-Ambitions All-Rookie Team
Katie Burt, Hockey East Rookie of the Month (December 2014) 
Katie Burt, Hockey East Defensive Player of the Month (December 2014) 
Katie Burt, Hockey East Defensive Player of the Week (Week of December 15, 2014) 
Katie Burt, Hockey East Defensive Player of the Month (January 2015) 
Alex Carpenter, 2015 Patty Kazmaier Award
Alex Carpenter, Hockey East Player of the Month (October 2014) 
Alex Carpenter, Hockey East Player of the Month (November 2014) 
Alex Carpenter, Hockey East Player of the Week (Week of December 15, 2014) 
Kenzie Kent, Hockey East Rookie of the Month (November 2014) 
Kenzie Kent, Runner-Up, Hockey East Rookie of the Month (October 2014)

Hockey East All-Stars
Alexandra Carpenter, 2014-15 Hockey East First Team All-Star
Megan Keller, 2014-15 Hockey East First Team All-Star
Emily Pfalzer, 2014-15 Hockey East First Team All-Star

Miscellaneous
The 2014-15 BC Eagles were only the second Hockey East women's team to be undefeated in regular season play (University of New Hampshire 2007-08).
They are also tied with the 07-08 UNH team for season wins (20) and winning percentage (.976) in league play.
They completed the longest Hockey East Women's winning streak, started in the prior season on 21 February 2015 (25 games).
They set the all-time Hockey East Women's record for single season goals, with 114.
Alex Carpenter became the third-highest Hockey East single season points leader with 41 points.  She was already the highest single season points leader from the 2012-13 season (48 points).
In her freshman year, Katie Burt broke the Hockey East Women's Goaltenders' records for Goals Against Average (0.61 goals per game) and Save Percentage (.965).

References

Boston College
Boston College Eagles women's ice hockey seasons
NCAA women's ice hockey Frozen Four seasons
Boston College Eagles women's ice hockey season
Boston College Eagles women's ice hockey season
Boston College Eagles women's ice hockey season
Boston College Eagles women's ice hockey season